Guillaume-François Debure (25 January 1731 in Paris – 15 February 1782 in Paris) was a French printer and bibliographer. The printer Guillaume Debure (1734–1820) was his cousin.

Works (selection) 
1755: Museum typographicum, seu collectio in qua omnes fere libri rarissimi...recensentur, printed only to 12 copies and published under the name G. F. Rebude, anagram of his surname.
1763–1768: Bibliographie instructive, ou Traité de la connaissance des livres rares et singuliers, in-8
 several Catalogs of libraries sought after from the 19th century for the way they are written.

External links 
 Guillaume-François Debure on data.bnf.fr

Writers from Paris
1731 births
1782 deaths
French bibliographers
French printers